The 1900 Detroit Tigers season was the Tigers' first in the American League, which received recognition as a major league one year later in 1901. The Tigers finished in fourth place out of eight teams with a record of 71–67, 12-1/2 games behind Charles Comiskey's Chicago White Stockings. Detroit's home games were played at Bennett Park. George Stallings was the manager.

Outfielder Dick Harley led the team with a .325 batting average, 77 runs scored, and 47 stolen bases. Sport McAllister led in slugging percentage (.383), and Frank Dillon led in extra-base hits (30).

Roscoe Miller led the team with a 19-9 win-loss record for a .679 win percentage. Jack Cronin led in innings pitched (372) and strikeouts (121).

After the 1900 season, the Detroit Free Press wrote that not since the 1887 Detroit Wolverines won the National League championship had baseball been as "liberally supported" in Detroit, and the club's gate receipts had been "a source of envy to other magnates in the league." The paper noted that owners James D. Burns and George Stallings had spent large sums of money for "releases of star players" and had paid "major league salaries" to the majority of the players.

Players

Batting 
Note: Pos = Position; G = Games played; AB = At bats; H = Hits; Avg. = Batting average; R = Runs scored; SB = Stolen bases

Pitching 
Note: G = Games pitched; IP = Innings pitched; W = Wins; L = Losses; PCT = Win percentage; SO = Strikeouts

References
 

Detroit Tigers seasons
Detroit Tigers season
Detroit Tigers
1900 in Detroit